Appasus is a genus of giant water bugs (family Belostomatidae) found in freshwater habitats in Asia and Africa.

Giant water bugs exhibit male parental care. In Appasus and other species in the subfamily Belostomatinae (but not subfamily Lethocerinae), the female glues the eggs onto the male's back, and the male tends them until the eggs hatch.

Species
Partial list of species:

Appasus ampliatus (Montandon, 1914)
Appasus capensis (Mayr, 1843)
Appasus grassei (Poisson, 1937)
Appasus japonicus (Vuillefroy, 1864)
Appasus major (Esaki, 1934)
Appasus quadrivittatus Bergroth, 1893
Appasus stappersi (Montandon, 1916)

References

External links 
 image

Belostomatidae
Nepomorpha genera
Taxa named by Charles Jean-Baptiste Amyot
Taxa named by Jean Guillaume Audinet-Serville